The discography of N.O.R.E., consists of six studio albums (including one Spanish-language album), two compilation albums, five mixtapes and 28 singles (including four as a featured artist).

Albums

Studio albums

Compilations

Mixtapes

Singles

As lead artist

As featured artist

Guest appearances

See also
 Capone-N-Noreaga discography

References

Discographies of American artists
Hip hop discographies